María Clara Sosa Perdomo (born 25 September 1993) is a Paraguayan model, TV Host and beauty queen who was crowned Miss Grand Paraguay 2018 and was later crowned Miss Grand International 2018 in Yangon, Myanmar. She is the first Paraguayan woman to win the Miss Grand International title.

Early life and career
Sosa was born in the capital of Paraguay, Asunción, and raised in San Lorenzo. She is a model at ON Management and also a host at the morning show La mañana de Unicanal.

Pageantry
In 2015, Sosa joined and finished in the Top 20 semifinalist at Miss Model of the World 2015 competition. On 9 June 2018, Sosa was crowned as Miss Grand Paraguay 2018 held its finale night at the Hotel Guarani Theatre. She succeeded outgoing Miss Grand Paraguay 2017, Lia Duarte Ashmore.

As Miss Grand Paraguay, Sosa won the competition and was crowned Miss Grand International 2018 was held on 25 October 2018 at One Entertainment Park in Yangon, Myanmar by outgoing titleholder Miss Grand International 2017, María José Lora of Peru. She is the first titleholder from Paraguay and the second from South America.

During the final question for all five was, "If you were crowned Miss Grand International 2018 tonight and you could choose one country for your first visit to run your first 'Stop the War and Violence Campaign', which country would you choose and what would be your message to them?"

Her court included Meenakshi Chaudhary of India (first runner-up), Nadia Purwoko of Indonesia (second runner-up), Nicole Colón of Puerto Rico (third runner-up) and Haruka Oda of Japan (fourth runner-up).

References

External links

Miss Grand International winners
1993 births
Living people
Paraguayan beauty pageant winners
Paraguayan female models
People from Asunción
Miss Grand Paraguay